Bjarne Slapgard (11 November 1901 – 25 December 1997) was a Norwegian educator and writer.

Slapgard was born at  Verdal in Nord-Trøndelag, Norway.
He taught at  Nordmøre folk  school (Nordmøre Folkehøgskule)  at Surnadal in Møre og Romsdal (1931–1938). 
He was the headmaster of Hardanger folk school (Hardanger Folkehøgskole) at Lofthus from  1938 to 1957.
He worked at Nordbygda school at Frosta in Trøndelag (1957–1966). In retirement, he moved to Levanger. 
He served as  chairman of Noregs Mållag from 1970–1971. He also published novels, plays, children's books, short stories and poems. His works included the trilogy Under regnbogen (1981), Under bannstrålen (1983) and Under rose med rubin (1985).

References

1901 births
1997 deaths
People from Verdal
20th-century Norwegian dramatists and playwrights
20th-century Norwegian novelists
20th-century Norwegian poets
Norwegian male dramatists and playwrights
Norwegian male novelists
Norwegian male poets
Nynorsk-language writers
Noregs Mållag leaders
Norwegian educators
Norwegian children's writers
20th-century Norwegian male writers